Stênio Zanetti Toledo (born 5 April 2003), commonly known as Stênio, is a Brazilian footballer who plays as a forward for Cruzeiro.

Career statistics

Club

Notes

References

2003 births
Living people
Brazilian footballers
Association football forwards
Campeonato Brasileiro Série B players
Cruzeiro Esporte Clube players